is a 1992 tournament-style fighting game developed and published by Technōs Japan exclusively in Japan for the Family Computer on December 23, 1992. It is a spin-off of the Kunio-kun series, as well as Technōs Japan's first attempt in the genre since their port of their Double Dragon arcade game on the same platform. Technōs Japan later became better known for its Neo Geo titles, such as Double Dragon fighting game and Voltage Fighter Gowcaizer.

It is also the first fighting game to allow up to four players to play simultaneously against each other. In order for more than two players to play, a multitap (like the 4-Players Adaptor by Hori) is required.

External links
Nekketsu Kakutō Densetsu promotional flyer at Giant Bomb

1992 video games
Japan-exclusive video games
Kunio-kun
Nintendo Entertainment System games
Nintendo Entertainment System-only games
Technōs Japan games
Video games developed in Japan
Fighting games
Multiplayer and single-player video games